East of Samarinda is a collection of stories by author Carl Jacobi.  It was released in 1989 by Bowling Green State University Popular Press.  Although Jacobi is known mostly for his horror and science fiction stories, this book collects adventure stories set in Borneo and the South Seas.  The collection was edited by Carl Jacobi and R. Dixon Smith.  Jacobi also provides a preface and Smith wrote the introduction ("Open Hell Without Quarter"). 

The stories 21 originally appeared in pulp magazines such as Thrilling Adventure and are reprinted in facsimile from the original pulps in which they appeared, including illustrations.

Setting

Fourteen of the short stories are set in Dutch East Borneo, two in British North Borneo, two in New Guinea, two in the South Seas (South China Sea, East China Sea and Southern Pacific Ocean) and one off the coast of the Unfederated Malay States.

Contents

East of Samarinda contains the following stories:

 "Crocodile"
Originally published in Complete Stories, 30 April 1934
 "Letter of Dismissal"
Originally published in Top-Notch, October 1934
 "Sumpitan"
Originally published in Top-Notch, October 1935
 "Death on Tin Can"
Originally published in The Skipper, December 1937
 "East of Samarinda"
Originally published in The Skipper, July 1937
 "The Jade Scarlotti"
Originally published in Short Stories, 10 July 1948
 "Death's Outpost"
Originally published in Thrilling Mystery, May 1939
 "Leopard Tracks"
Originally published in Short Stories, 10 July 1938
 "Deceit Post"
Originally published in Complete Stories, 18 February 1935
 "Jungle Wires"
Originally published in Complete Stories, 24 September 1934
 "Holt Sails the 'San Hing'"
Originally published in Short Stories, 25 January 1938
 "Quarry"
Originally published in Dime Adventure Magazine, December 1935
 "Trial by Jungle"
Originally published in Thrilling Adventures, September 1939
 "Hamadryad Chair"
Originally published in 10 Story Mystery Magazine, February 1942
 "A Film in the Bush"
Originally published in Doc Savage, September 1937
 "Redemption Trail"
Originally published in Thrilling Adventures, October 1941
 "Black Passage"
Originally published in Thrilling Adventures, May 1936
 "Spider Wires"
Originally published in Thrilling Adventures, January 1937
 "Tiger Island"
Originally published in Thrilling Adventures, May 1937
 "Dead Man's River"
Originally published in Thrilling Adventures, January 1937
 "Submarine I-26"
Originally published in Doc Savage, March 1944

See also

:Category:Science fiction short story collections by Carl Jacobi
Samarinda

Sources

1989 short story collections
American short story collections
Pulp stories
Works originally published in American magazines
Works originally published in pulp magazines
Borneo in fiction